Asterolasia correifolia is a species of erect shrub that is endemic to eastern Australia. It has white to brown star-shaped hairs on its stems, lance-shaped to elliptical leaves densely covered with white star-shaped hairs on the lower surface, and white to cream-coloured or yellow flowers arranged in umbels of four to ten or more in leaf axils, the back of the petals densely covered with white hairs.

Description
The lower surface of the leaves are covered with white and pigmented, star-shaped hairs.

Taxonomy
This species was first formally described in 1825 by Adrien-Henri de Jussieu who gave it the name Phebalium correaefolium and published the description in Mémoires de la Société d'Histoire Naturelle de Paris. In 1863, George Bentham changed the name to Asterolasia correifolia in Flora Australiensis.

In 2019, Philippa R. Alvarez and Marco Duretto published a paper suggesting that the plants previously known as A. correifolia occurring in Queensland and those on the Northern Tablelands of New South Wales were different species. They gave those in Queensland the name Asterolasia sola and those on the Northern Tablelands A. exasperata. The new names have not yet been accepted by the Australian Plant Census.

Distribution and habitat
This species grows in wet forests in moist gullies and occurs in Carnarvon National Park in Queensland, and on the North and Central Coasts, Central and Southern Highlands of New South Wales.

References

correifolia
Flora of New South Wales
Flora of Queensland
Plants described in 1825
Taxa named by Adrien-Henri de Jussieu